Nathaniel Caleb Atkinson (born 13 June 1999) is an Australian professional footballer who plays as a right back for Scottish Premiership side Heart of Midlothian.

Club career

Early career
Born in Launceston, Tasmania, Atkinson was part of the youth setup at Riverside Olympic before joining the NTC program at Football Tasmania. In 2016, Atkinson joined the Melbourne City academy after a successful trial with the club. He played with the Melbourne City NPL side in the NPL Victoria from 2016 to 2017. Towards the end of the 2016–17 season, Atkinson began training with the Melbourne City first team.

Melbourne City
Going into the 2017–18 season, Atkinson was given the 37 shirt. He made his competitive debut for the first team in a FFA Cup match against Peninsula Power at Dolphin Oval on 1 August 2017. He came on as a late stoppage time substitute for Bruno Fornaroli as Melbourne City won the match 2–0. On 10 December 2017, due to the suspension of Melbourne City's regular right-back Manny Muscat, Atkinson made his A-League debut for the club against the Central Coast Mariners. Despite being named as a right back before the match, Atkinson played the match as a right winger as Melbourne City managed to win 1–0. After the match, Melbourne City head coach Warren Joyce praised Atkinson, saying "I thought he took his opportunity well. He’s one that caught my eye as soon as I came to the club."

On 12 January 2018, after a promising start, Atkinson signed a two-year senior contract with Melbourne City.

In September 2020, Atkinson signed a two-year contract with Perth Glory. However, three weeks later, his contract was terminated due to the COVID-19 pandemic situation, allowing him to sign another two-year contract with Melbourne City.

On 24 December 2021, Atkinson signed a three-and-a-half year contract with Scottish Premiership club Heart of Midlothian, with the deal going through on 10 January 2022.

International career
In January 2017, Atkinson was selected to train with the Australia U20 side.

In November 2019 he was one of four players suspended by the Australia U23 due to "unprofessional conduct".

Atkinson qualified for the Tokyo 2020 Olympics. He was part of the Olyroos Olympic squad. The team beat Argentina in their first group match but were unable to win another match. They were therefore not in medal contention.

He was called up to the senior Australia squad for the 2022 FIFA World Cup qualifiers on 24 and 29 March 2022.

Atkinson was named in Australia's squad for the 2022 FIFA World Cup in November 2022.

Honours
Melbourne City
 A-League Men Premiership: 2020–21
 A-League Men Championship: 2021

Individual
 Joe Marston Medal: 2021

Career statistics

Club

International

Notes

References

External links 
 Melbourne City FC Profile .

1999 births
Living people
Sportspeople from Launceston, Tasmania
Soccer players from Tasmania
Australian soccer players
Melbourne City FC players
Perth Glory FC players
Association football midfielders
National Premier Leagues players
A-League Men players
Footballers at the 2020 Summer Olympics
Olympic soccer players of Australia
2022 FIFA World Cup players